Annabella Madeleine Bixby (born November 20, 1995) is an American soccer player who plays as a goalkeeper for Portland Thorns FC.

Early life
Bixby attended Rex Putnam High School in Milwaukie, Oregon.

Oregon State University
Bixby attended Oregon State University and played 72 games for its women's soccer team. She posted 18 clean sheets while setting a university record for most career saves.

Club career

Portland Thorns FC selected Bixby in the third round of the 2018 NWSL College Draft. She was injured for most of her first year with Portland and was forced to miss most of the year after suffering another injury while on loan in Germany. She then spent part of 2019 off on loan in Israel.

Bixby made her professional debut for the Thorns on June 27, 2020 in the 2020 NWSL Challenge Cup, a 2-1 loss to the North Carolina Courage. After posting two clean sheets in her first four games for the club, she suffered an ACL injury that forced her to miss the rest of the Challenge Cup.

In July 2021, Bixby set the NWSL record for most shutout minutes to start an NWSL regular-season career, starting the 2021 NWSL season with 269 consecutive shutout minutes across her first three games, becoming the third goalkeeper in the league's history to post back-to-back clean sheets in their regular season debuts. She won the Save of the Week Award for the first week of August 2021.

Activism
Bixby has been outspoken on issues within soccer, calling out inconsistent media coverage of the NWSL and the quality of the NWSL's broadcast product. In early July 2021, she called for the league to drop the "W" from its name, stating that it was both non-inclusive and that it promoted the misconception that the women's side of the game was abnormal. In late-July 2021, she called on Racing Louisville FC to end the light show at Lynn Family Stadium played after Louisville scored, stating that "players reported feeling physically ill. I am someone who has sensory integration issues & had to put a towel over my eyes and pray to god I didn't have a meltdown seconds before the 2nd half."

Bixby took part in the NWSL Players Association's #NoMoreSideHustles campaign for better compensation for women's football players, revealing that she had to have a second job for Uber for a year while playing in the NWSL. The NWSL Players Association also named Bixby one of the Thorns' player representatives for 2022.

Personal life
In December 2018, Bixby married her husband Elliot and began using her married name.

Bixby is on the autism spectrum.

Honors
Portland Thorns FC
 NWSL Community Shield: 2020
 NWSL Challenge Cup: 2021
 International Champions Cup: 2021
 NWSL Shield: 2021
 NWSL Save of the Week: 2021 weeks 11, 17; 2022 week 8
 NWSL Championship: 2022

References

External links

 
 Player profile at Portland Thorns FC
 Player profile at US Soccer Federation
 Oregon State profile
 
 
 

1995 births
Living people
Sportspeople from Milwaukie, Oregon
Soccer players from Oregon
American women's soccer players
American expatriate women's soccer players
American expatriate soccer players in Germany
Women's association football goalkeepers
Portland Thorns FC players
1. FFC Frankfurt players
National Women's Soccer League players
Oregon State Beavers women's soccer players
Portland Thorns FC draft picks